The C-2 is a rail service of the Cercanías Madrid commuter rail network, operated by Renfe Operadora. It runs from Guadalajara to Chamartín.

Infrastructure
Like the rest of Cercanías Madrid services, the C-2 runs on the Iberian gauge mainline railway system, which is owned by Adif, an agency of the Spanish government. The trains of the C-2 service call at up to 19 stations, using the following railway lines, in order from west to east:

List of stations
The following table lists the name of each station served by the C-2 in order from west to east; the station's service pattern offered by C-8 trains; the transfers to other Cercanías Madrid services; remarkable transfers to other transport systems; the municipality in which each station is located; and the fare zone each station belongs to according to the Madrid Metro fare zone system.

References

Cercanías Madrid